William Demarest (born December 20, 1964) is an American sport shooter. He was born in Worcester, Massachusetts. He competed at the 2000 Summer Olympics in Sydney.

References

External links

1964 births
American male sport shooters
Living people
Olympic shooters of the United States
Shooters at the 2000 Summer Olympics
Sportspeople from Worcester, Massachusetts
United States Distinguished Marksman